Justin Charles Pierce (March 21, 1975 – July 10, 2000) was a British-born American actor and skateboarder who grew up in the U.S. He is best known for his roles as Casper in the 1995 film Kids and Roach in the 2000 film Next Friday. On July 10, 2000, Pierce died by suicide in Paradise, Nevada.

Early life
Pierce was born in London, England, to a Welsh mother and an Australian father and was brought up in the Marble Hill and Kingsbridge sections of New York City. Pierce's mother met his father while abroad and never told him who his real father was.

He began stealing cigarettes and food, and frequently missed school in favor of skateboarding. Pierce soon quit school and moved out, staying in a "warren of rooms" in a basement of a building on 176th Street,  that was "teeming" with fellow skaters. Pierce was later arrested for possession of marijuana and heroin.

Career
Pierce was a member of the original Zoo York skateboard team, and is featured in the Zoo York 'Mixtape' video (1998), magazines and adverts for the company. He was also a member of the original Supreme Crew with fellow Zoo York team riders and close friends Harold Hunter and Peter Bici.

He appeared in the 1997 film A Brother's Kiss as the young Lex, played as an adult by Nick Chinlund. Pierce also appeared in television movies, including 1997's First Time Felon. He also starred alongside Ice Cube and Mike Epps in the film Next Friday as Roach. Pierce's last on-screen appearance was in the 2002 film Looking for Leonard, released after his death. The film was dedicated to his memory.

In his memory, Supreme have released featured images of his skateboarding (taken by photographer Ari Marcopoulos) in its clothing lines and publications. Promotional footage of Pierce and the Supreme Crew skateboarding has surfaced on the Supreme New York website. While skateboarding in Washington Square Park, Pierce was discovered by film director Larry Clark, who cast him in his controversial 1995 film Kids. After the success of Kids, Pierce won an Independent Spirit Award for his portrayal of Casper, the profane and drug-addicted skateboarder friend of Telly (Leo Fitzpatrick), and relocated to Los Angeles.

Personal life
In July 1999, Pierce married stylist Gina Rizzo in Las Vegas.

Death
On July 10, 2000, Pierce was found hanging in his room at the Bellagio Hotel in Paradise, Nevada by hotel security. His death was determined to be a suicide. Two suicide notes were reported to be found, which have not been released to the public. On July 15th, a Catholic memorial service for Pierce was held at St. Patrick's Old Cathedral in Manhattan. He is buried in Gate of Heaven Cemetery in Valhalla, New York.

Filmography

Accolades

References

External links

1975 births
2000 deaths
Male actors from New York City
English emigrants to the United States
English male film actors
English skateboarders
English male television actors
People from the Bronx
Suicides by hanging in Nevada
English people of Welsh descent
2000 suicides
Burials at Gate of Heaven Cemetery (Hawthorne, New York)